This is a list of cars produced by Dallara.

References

Dallara